The Consulate General of France in Cape Town is a consular representation of the French Republic in South Africa. The consular district includes the three Cape provinces, Prince Edward Islands and the British territory of Saint Helena (Saint Helena Island, Tristan Da Cunha Archipelago, Ascension Island). 
Three honorary Consuls, in Port Elizabeth, East London and Saint Helena depend on the Consulate of Cape Town. People living in Lesotho or in one in the six other South African provinces depend on the French Consulate General of Johannesburg.
The Consulate General is currently located on 78 Queen Victoria Street.

Under the authority of the Ministry of Foreign Affairs and International Development (France), the Consulate General of France is responsible for the protection and administrative affairs of French nationals settled or traveling within South Africa.

The Consulate General provides many services to the French community and those who desire to travel to France.

History 

The French Consulate General in Cape Town, according to the archives of the French Ministry of Foreign Affairs is, the oldest in Southern Africa. In 1803, Napoleon Bonaparte nominated a certain Gaillande "superintendent of trade relations in Cape Town", equivalent to what is now the rank of Vice-Consul. His responsibility was to provide supplies to the naval division of Rear-Admiral Linois. Gaillande stayed in this post until January 10, 1806, the date when Cape Town was taken over by the English.

A Consular Agency, dependent of the French Consulate General in London, was recreated after the fall of the First Empire in June 1817 and Count des Escotais was appointed. The latter began his job on August 3, 1818. The Consular Agency was erected as a Consulate in November 1818.

The first civil status act registered in the French Consulate of Cape Town was on January 6, 1871 between Charles Marie Ernest de la Cornillière, from Cape Town and Miss Stella Hendrina Hampt, from Paarl.

Consular services

Visas service 

A visa allows a foreigner and non-European Union member, to enter and travel temporarily within French territory.

The Chancellery 

The chancellery provides all of administrative services to French citizens abroad. It is necessary to contact the chancellery as soon as your documents have been lost or stolen, regarding the renewal of passports or to obtain scholarships, grants, or other scholar financial aides. This service establishes itself as a direct interface between migrants and their nation of origin.

Cultural services 

The Alliance Française in Cape Town possess a cultural service department that satisfies the following missions:

 Encourage French cultural productions by helping professionals and artists in South Africa,
 Promote the French educational system by managing the careers of French teachers, professors, and research workers in the South Africa, establishing guidance for students and parents, organizing national exams,
 Support all possible efforts towards artistic events, cultural establishments, and higher education.

France Abroad

The Consul 

The current Consul General of France is Laurent Alberti, incumbent since 2020.

Honorary Consuls 

Three honorary Consuls, in Port Elizabeth, East London and Saint Helena depend on the Consulate of Cape Town.

French Presence 

The Consulate General collaborates regularly with numerous French associations and organizations abroad.

The French community in Cape Town 

As of December 2013, there are about 7300 French citizens in South Africa and 2804 living in Cape Town.

See also 
 List of diplomatic missions of France
 Foreign relations of France

References

External links 
 Official Website of the French Consulate General in Cape Town
 Official Website of the French Consulate in Johannesburg
 Official Website of the French Embassy in Pretoria

Cape Town
Diplomatic missions in South Africa
France–South Africa relations